Patricia Mauceri (born April 7, 1950) is an American actress. She is best known for playing the role of Carlotta Vega on the ABC soap opera, One Life to Live.

Early life and career
Mauceri was born in Brooklyn, New York. She played Angie Perrini Frame on Another World in 1977. She has had small roles in films such as Saving Grace and Die Hard with a Vengeance, and appeared in television shows such as Law & Order and The Sopranos.

Mauceri portrayed Carlotta Vega on the ABC soap opera, One Life to Live from 1995 until March 25, 2009. She was reportedly replaced in the role after voicing personal religious objections to a planned storyline in which Carlotta would be supportive of a gay relationship.

Mauceri has served on the theatre faculty of the MasterWorks Festival since 2005.

A short documentary about Mauceri was filmed by Olive Tree Pictures. In 2017 she portrayed Jenny Sanchez in the faith-based movie Courageous Love.

Filmography

Film

Television

References

External links 
 
 PatriciaMauceri.com
 MasterWorksFestival.org

1950 births
Living people
American soap opera actresses
American television actresses
American film actresses
21st-century American women